Laelapsoides is a genus of mites in the family Laelapidae.

Species
 Laelapsoides dentatus (Halbert, 1920)
 Laelaspoides ordwayae Eickwort, 1966

References

Laelapidae